This is a list of heads of government who were later imprisoned. There have been several individuals throughout history who served as head of state or head of government (such as president, prime minister or monarch) of their nation states and later became prisoners. Any serving or former head who was placed under house arrest or became a prisoner of war is also included. Leaders who were kidnapped by insurgents or those who received an Interpol notice that was not consummated are not included.

Africa

Asia

Europe

North America

Oceania

South America

See also
List of former heads of regimes who were sentenced to death
List of former heads of regimes who were sentenced to death by hanging

References

 
Imprisoned
Imprisoned
Lists of prisoners and detainees